Paffendorf is a German electronic dance music project. The group consists of Ramon Zenker, also producer of Fragma, Gottfried Engels and Nicolas Valli. The project is represented by the Cologne DJ Christian Schmitz, active on Tiger Records. Paffendorf is best known for their year 2000 hit, "Where Are You", although they have had various successful hits across Europe, their best known in the UK being "Be Cool," which peaked at number 7 in the UK Singles Chart in June, 2002. Their song, "Under My Skin", had become an Internet meme, featuring Momo, a character from the anime series Sumomomo Momomo repetitively imitating a train engine with her hands and jumping up and down. The song had been sped up to sound similar and rival to a more popular Internet meme, Caramelldansen.

History
Ramon Zenker was involved in a number of dance music projects in the late 80's, including Interactive ("Who Is Elvis"). Engel's and Zenker's Samba dance project Bellini, centered around three female singers, began in 1997 with the release of "Samba de Janeiro" in various versions. It became an international hit (#2 in Germany) and was followed by an album and more singles.

The trance project Paffendorf debuted with "Smile" (#22 in Germany) in 1998. "Ruf Mich An" / "Call Me Now" and "Terminator" achieved Top 50 status. In the year 2000 they continued in that vein and made their breakthrough: "Where are You" went into the German Top 15 with "Everybody Scream" also making the Top 50. Their hit album, Dance City was also placed firmly in the Top 50 of the album charts. The track "Rhythm And Sex" continued the run, whilst "Be Cool" went to #7 in the UK Singles Chart in June 2002. At the same time Zenker co-founded and produced the Fragma ("Toca's Miracle").

Their thirteenth single release, "Under My Skin", was successful in Japan, particular in the video hosting service, NicoNico Douga. It was first shown in a fan-vid featuring the character Momo from Sumomomo Momomo, plus the Jens O Remix  version of the song that was shortened and played twice. Westerners sometimes called this the "Paffendorf Dance". Another version of this video involved characters from Lucky Star.

Discography

Albums
 2000: Dance City
 2001: Be Cool
 2007: Planet Dance

Singles

Videos
 1998: Smile
 1998: Ruf Mich An
 1998: Terminator 2 Theme: Main Title
 2000: Where Are You
 2001: Rhythm & Sex
 2002: Be Cool
 2002: Crazy, Sexy, Marvellous
 2005: On & On
 2006: La La La Girl
 2006: Where Are You 2007

References

External links
 Official website - doesn't work!

German Eurodance groups
German dance music groups